Franklin Township is one of the twenty townships of Darke County, Ohio, United States. The 2010 census found 1,241 people in the township.

Geography
Located in the southeastern part of the county, it borders the following townships:
Adams Township - north
Newberry Township, Miami County - northeast corner
Newton Township, Miami County - east
Monroe Township - south
Twin Township - southwest corner
Van Buren Township - west

No municipalities are located in Franklin Township.

Name and history
Franklin Township was established in 1839, and named for the printer and statesman Benjamin Franklin. It is one of twenty-one Franklin Townships statewide.

Government
The township is governed by a three-member board of trustees, who are elected in November of odd-numbered years to a four-year term beginning on the following January 1. Two are elected in the year after the presidential election and one is elected in the year before it. There is also an elected township fiscal officer, who serves a four-year term beginning on April 1 of the year after the election, which is held in November of the year before the presidential election. Vacancies in the fiscal officership or on the board of trustees are filled by the remaining trustees.  The trustees in 2007 were Gary Hutchinson, Terry Warner, and Jack Brumbaugh, and the clerk is Bonnie Feitshans.

References

External links
County website

Townships in Darke County, Ohio
Townships in Ohio